Clapham Junction is an urban locality around Clapham Junction railway station in London, England.

Clapham Junction may also refer to:
 Clapham Junction railway station in London, England
 Clapham Junction (Malta), a prehistoric site on Malta
 Clapham Junction rail crash of 1988, near Clapham Junction railway station 
 Clapham Junction (film), a 2007 film